Al-Hayat al-Jadida is an official daily newspaper of the Palestinian National Authority. The paper was established in 1995.

References

External links
 

1995 establishments in the Palestinian territories
Arabic-language newspapers
Daily newspapers
Mass media in Ramallah
Newspapers established in 1995
Newspapers published in the State of Palestine
Palestinian politics